Khanlar Qeshlaqi Hajj Bala Beyglu (also Romanized as Khānlar Qeshlāqī Ḩājj Bālā Beyglū; also known as Khānlar Qeshlāqī-ye Soflá) is a village in Aslan Duz Rural District, Aslan Duz District, Parsabad County, Ardabil Province, Iran. At the 2006 census, its population was 166, in 26 families.

References 

Towns and villages in Parsabad County